Sexandroide is a 1987 French short horror film directed by Michel Ricaud. This film has music composed by Jimmy Screamerclauz.

Plot
A monstrous madman stalks and slowly mutilates young girls through various disturbing and gruesome methods.

Cast
Daniel Dubois plays a voodoo practitioner in the segment "La Dagyde", a torturous monster in the segment "Les Sexandroïdes" and a vampire in the segment "Avec la Compagnine".

References

External links
 

1980s French-language films
1987 films
French horror films
1987 horror films
1980s French films
French short films